The 2022–23 Washington Huskies women's basketball team represented the University of Washington during the 2022–23 NCAA Division I women's basketball season. The Huskies, led by second year head coach Tina Langley, played their home games at Alaska Airlines Arena at Hec Edmundson Pavilion in Seattle, Washington and competed as members of the Pac-12 Conference.

Offseason

Previous season
The Huskies finished the 2021–22 season 7–16, 2–12 in Pac-12 play to finish in last place. As the No. 12 seed in the Pac-12 tournament, they lost in the first round to Colorado.

Departures

Incoming

Recruiting

Recruiting class of 2023

Roster

Schedule

|-
!colspan=9 style=| Exhibition

|-
!colspan=9 style=| Regular Season

|-
!colspan=9 style=| Pac-12 Women's Tournament

|-
!colspan=9 style=| WNIT

Source:

See also
 2022–23 Washington Huskies men's basketball team

References

Washington Huskies women's basketball seasons
Washington Huskies women
Washington Huskies basketball, women
Washington Huskies basketball, women
Washington Huskies basketball, women
Washington Huskies basketball, women
Washington